The 2011–12 season was the 62nd season in which Crawley Town have played senior football, and the seventh as a fully professional team. It was the first time in the club's history that they competed in The Football League. Crawley Town competed in the Football League Two, the fourth tier of English football, where they finished 3rd, gaining promotion to League One, the third tier of English football. The club also competed in the FA Cup, where they reached the fifth round, prior to being knocked out by then Premier League club Stoke City. They also competed in the League Cup and the Football League Trophy, where they were knocked out in the first round.

League table

Results

Friendly matches

League Two

FA Cup

Football League Cup

Football League Trophy

Squad statistics

Appearances and goals

|-
|colspan="14"|Players featured for Crawley but left before the end of the season:

|-
|colspan="14"|Players on loan for Crawley Town who returned to their parent club:

|}

Top scorers

Disciplinary record

Transfers

Transfers in

Loans in

Transfers out

Loans out

Awards

References

Crawley Town F.C. seasons
Crawley Town